Pär Cederqvist (born 10 March 1980), sometimes spelled Pär Cederquist, is a Swedish former professional footballer.

Career
Cederqvist represented Djurgårdens IF, Östers IF, Walsall, Raufoss IL, Landskrona BoIS and Jönköpings Södra IF. He is the all-time top goalscorer of Superettan, as of 2018.

Honours 
Djurgårdens IF
 Allsvenskan: 2003
 Svenska Cupen: 2004

References

External links
 
  (archive)

1980 births
Living people
Swedish footballers
Allsvenskan players
Superettan players
IFK Värnamo players
Djurgårdens IF Fotboll players
Åtvidabergs FF players
Östers IF players
Raufoss IL players
Walsall F.C. players
Landskrona BoIS players
Expatriate footballers in England
Swedish expatriate footballers
Expatriate footballers in Norway
Swedish expatriate sportspeople in Norway
Jönköpings Södra IF players
Association football forwards
People from Värnamo Municipality
Sportspeople from Jönköping County